Mahamat Zene Cherif (born 1964) is a Chadian diplomat and politician. He served as Minister of Foreign Affairs of Chad from December 2017 to his resignation in September 2022. before serving as the Minister of Communication for a brief stint and then being re-appointed in May 2021 to once again continue as the Minister of Foreign Affairs. He previously served as the Permanent Representative of Chad to the United Nations in New York.

Zene has a Master of Laws degree from the Taras Shevchenko National University of Kyiv. He joined the Chadian foreign ministry in 1993. From 2007 to 2013, he was the ambassador of Chad to Ethiopia and Chad's Permanent Representative to the African Union and the UN Economic Commission for Africa.

Zene has worked in a variety of other government posts and was Business Director of Air Chad in 1997 and 1998.

In December 2014, Zene was the President of the United Nations Security Council.

On September 19, 2022, he tendered his resignation as Minister of Foreign Affairs.

Notes

External links

"New Permanent Representative of Chad Presents Credentials", UN Doc BIO/4526, 13 September 2013

1964 births
Chadian diplomats
Taras Shevchenko National University of Kyiv alumni
Permanent Representatives to the African Union
Permanent Representatives of Chad to the United Nations
Ambassadors of Chad to Ethiopia
Living people
Foreign ministers of Chad